Martin Simon is a composer and guitarist born in Roznava, Slovakia, in 1975. He has lived and worked in Bratislava, New York City and Warsaw.

Biography 
Raised in Bratislava, Slovakia, Simon began playing the guitar at the age of ten. He started to gain recognition after winning the "New Faces of Slovak Jazz" young talent jazz competition as a leader of the group Jazzva in 1996. He later moved to New York City in 1998. After receiving a travel/study grant he attended Brooklyn College Conservatory of Music where he received his master's degree. He was trained in composition by Tania León, and performance and interactive media arts by John J.A. Jannone and Miroslaw Rogala. His guitar mentors included Matus Jakabcic, Stanislav Pocaji, Fernando Correa, and Daniela Kukumbergova. From 2003 to 2006, Simon taught electronic music composition for film and animation at Pratt Institute in New York. His avant-garde musical concepts were shown in Europe and USA, including the International Society for Improvised Music, International festival and conference on Improvised Music, and published by the University Press of America.

Simon has combined in his music the classical and electric guitar sound with modern jazz, rock, acoustic and classical music, free improvisation and other world elements. He has used avant-garde concepts in some of his experimental works, electronic music and multimedia interactive art projects. His body of work has been compared to the work of acoustic guitar virtuoso Don Ross and the experimentation of multi-instrumentalist George Koller.

This alliance of music aesthetics is found both in his early compositions (1995–1998)—jazz fusion works in which jazz fundaments are treated with synthesizer sounds and electric instruments creating juxtapositions of intense jazz-rock sonic materials with harmonically rich, sometimes almost esoteric material —and in later pieces (2000–2006), in which the integration of opposites, inherent performance complexities and game-like attitude creates the opportunity for free interaction, fusion of singled sounds or even whole ensembles. These compositions are examples of "conversational music", a term he uses to describe a musical language constructed from processes governing a verbal conversation, that are handled in a musical way. Simon's most recent compositions draw inspiration from Central European folkloric traditions placed in context with jazz, classical music and contemporary influences.

Simon's guitar duet with Spanish/Honduran guitarist Astor Escoto resulted in an album Escoto & Simon “Collage” described as "one of the best contemporary world guitar albums of the decade". Simon's composition “Vision of Seven Keystones” received a semi-finalist award in the instrumental category of the 2011 International Songwriting Competition ISC after receiving over 16,000 entries.

Simon has performed with a world mix of musicians from Western and Eastern Europe, North & South America, Asia, Africa, New Zealand such as David Watson (John Zorn), Paul Steven Ray (Vernon Reid), Salim Washington (Kenny Garret, Anthony Braxton), Chris Bacas (Buddy Rich), Jorge Amorim (Baden Powell, Al Foster), Arturo Martinez (José Greco), Alfonso Cid (Pilar Rioja), Carlos Hayre among others. He was member of the New York Mandolin Orchestra and BC Electro-acoustic Music Ensemble. He has collaborated with award-winning film and digital media artists like Miroslaw Rogala, John J.A. Jannone, Ronaldo Kiel, Anat Inbar, and SangHee Ann. He is a founding member of groups Escoto & Simon, Jazzva, Areito, BTY Orchestra, Astro Project, and Slavicada. He has participated in improvised music events along with masters of free improvisation including Oliver Lake, Art Lande, Mazen Kerbaj, Stephen Nachmanovitch, Pauline Oliveros, Michael Zerang, Anto Pett, Mark Dresser, Jane Ira Bloom, AACM and others.

Recordings 
 1998 — "Milky Way", Jazzva
 2001 — "Bridge to You" (Netomusica)
 2003 — "Convers Club" Live (Slovak Radio)
 2011 — "Collage" (Escoto & Simon)
 (Interactive CD-ROM) — 2001 Dificil de Atrapar/Hard to Catch (PIMA)

Other album contributions 
 1998 Madam Deklaracia (PIKI)
 2001 "Goal" Neto (Netomusica)
 2003 "BC Mix" Electro-acoustic Music Ensemble (BC-CCM)
 2005 60 x 60 (Vox Novus)
 2012 Witamy na swiecie: Koledowanie

Notes and reviews 
MARTINÁKOVÁ, Z.: Mladá slovenská skladateľská generácia – štýlové a názorové orientácie. In: Slovenská hudba 36, 2010/1, s. 27–62

SIMON, M. - CRESHEVSKY, N.: Music Through Conversation. In: ArtCircles: C Collaborative, New York 2005/7-8

HOUP, S.: A Beaver and an Eagel meet in the Bar. In: Globe and Mail, Toronto 2004, 29. 5.

IOAN, R.: Computer Music din Europa si S.U.A. In: Observator Cultural, Bukurešť 1, 2004

POKOJNÁ, K.: Soozvuk. In: Hudobný život, Bratislava 2004/7-8, s. 15

IOAN, R.: Nova Musica Consonante 2003/Computer Music. In: Actualitatea Muzicala, Bukurešť 2004/1

VACHOVÁ, Z.: Jazzové Vianoce. In: Infojazz 1998/1, s. 6

SITA: Súťažná prehliadka Jazzové Vianoce 97. In: Mesto.Sk, Nitra 1997, 8. 12.

KAJANOVÁ, Y.: Jazzové vianoce 1996. In: Hudobný život, Bratislava 1997/1

OKRUCKÝ, S.: Vydarená prehliadka džezových talentov. In: Pravda, Bratislava 1996

References

External links 
 Artist's Website
 Jazzcorner.com
 Stormthecastle.com
 Allaboutjazz.com
 Hc.sk

Slovak-American culture in New York (state)
Slovak composers
Male composers
Living people
1975 births
Brooklyn College alumni
Slovak male musicians